Pinewood Studios is a series of major film and television studios, with the primary studio situated approximately 20 miles west of London among the pine trees on what was the estate of Heatherden Hall, near the village of Iver Heath, Buckinghamshire. Users can now search an interactive filmography on the Pinewood Studios Group website.

Here is a list of Pinewood productions by Year and Studio Location:

Source:

Iver Heath

1930s-1990s

2000s to present

Television

EastEnders
Emmerdale
Extras
Little Charley Bear
The IT Crowd
Midsomer Murders
UFO (1970)
The Persuaders (1970–1971)
Space: 1999 (1975–1977)
Parallel 9 (1992–1994)
Potamus Park (1995-2002)
Teletubbies (1997-2001)
Bob the Builder (1998-2004)
My Family (2000-2011)
The Weakest Link (2001–2009)
Bob the Builder: Project: Build It (2005-2008)
La Casa De Papel (Money Heist) (2018)
Would I Lie to You? (2009–)
10 O'Clock Live (2011–2013)
Sing If You Can (2011)
Big School (2013–2014)
Through the Keyhole
Count Arthur Strong (2013–)
8 Out of 10 Cats (2013–)
The National Lottery Draws (2013–)
The Voice UK (2013; live shows only)
The Taste (2014)
Duck Quacks Don't Echo (2014–)
Birds of a Feather (2014–)
Red Dwarf (2015–2020)
The Great American Baking Show (2015–)
Still Open All Hours (2015–2019)
Debatable (2016–)
Taskmaster (2017–)
Tenable (2017–)
Not Going Out (2017)
Black Narcissus (2020)
Cursed (2020)
Red Dwarf: The Promised Land (2020)
The Nevers (2021)
Andor (2022)
Moon Knight (2022)
Willow (2022)
Loki (2023)
Lockwood & Co. (2023)

Atlanta (2013-2020)

Toronto 
It's a Boy Girl Thing (2006)
Chloe (2009)
Scott Pilgrim vs. the World (2010)
388 Arletta Avenue (2011)
Dream House (2011)
Take This Waltz (2011)
The Thing (2011)
Cosmopolis (2012)
Prometheus (2012)
Red Lights (2012)
The Vow (2012)
Total Recall (2012)
Carrie (2013)
Kick-Ass 2 (2013)
Mama (2013)
Pacific Rim (2013)
The Best Man Holiday (2013)
The Colony (2013)
RoboCop (2014)
The Captive (2014)
Wolves (2014)
Crimson Peak (2015)
He Never Died (2015)
Pixels (2015)
Poltergeist (2015)
Regression (2015)
Room (2015)
Spotlight (2015)
Special Correspondents (2016)
Suicide Squad (2016)
Downsizing (2017)
Flatliners (2017)
It (2017)
Molly's Game (2017)
A Simple Favor (2018)
XXX: Return of Xander Cage (2017)
The Christmas Chronicles (2018)
It Chapter Two (2019)
Let It Snow (2019)
Scary Stories to Tell in the Dark (2019)
Shazam! (2019)
Slumberland (2022)

Television
Battle of the Blades (2009–2013)
The Listener (2009–2014)
Happy Town (2010)
Beauty & the Beast (2012–2016)
The Strain (2014–2017)
Good Witch (2015–2021)
Schitt's Creek (2015–2020)
Star Trek: Discovery (2017–present)
Jupiter's Legacy (2021)

Malaysia (2009-2019) 
Lost in the Pacific (2015)

Television 
 Marco Polo (2014–16)

Dominican Republic 
XXX: Return of Xander Cage (2017)
47 Meters Down (2017)
If Beale Street Could Talk (2018)
47 Meters Down: Uncaged (2019)
Old (2021)
The Lost City (2022)
Shotgun Wedding (2023)

Television 
The I-Land (2019)

References

Citations

External links 
Pinewood Studios

British film studios
Films shot in England
Lists of British films
Culture in Buckinghamshire